The 1949 Canadian federal election was held June 27, 1949 to elect members of the House of Commons of Canada of the 21st Parliament of Canada.

The Liberal Party of Canada was re-elected with its fourth consecutive government, winning 191 seats (73 percent of the seats in the House of Commons), with just under 50 percent of the popular vote.

It was the Liberals' first election in almost thirty years not under the leadership William Lyon Mackenzie King. King had retired in 1948, and was replaced as Liberal leader and Prime Minister by Louis St. Laurent.

It was the first federal election with Newfoundland voting, having joined Canada in March of that year. It was also the first election since 1904 in which part of the remaining parts of the Northwest Territories were granted representation, following the partitioning off of the provinces of Alberta and Saskatchewan.

The Liberal Party victory was the largest majority in Canadian history to that point. , it remains the third largest majority government in Canadian history, and the largest in the party's history (the Progressive Conservative Party won larger seat majorities in 1958 and 1984).

The Progressive Conservative Party, led by former Premier of Ontario George Drew, gained little ground in this election. The party lost over a third of their seats.

Smaller parties, such as the social democratic Co-operative Commonwealth Federation, and Social Credit, a party that advocated monetary reform, lost support to the Liberals and, to a lesser extent, the Conservatives.

National results

Notes:

* The party did not nominate candidates in the previous election.

x - less than 0.005% of the popular vote

Vote and seat summaries

Results by province

xx - less than 0.05% of the popular vote

See also
 
List of Canadian federal general elections
List of political parties in Canada
21st Canadian Parliament

References

Further reading
 
 

 
1949
Federal election
Canadian federal election